Sakkarasamudram is a village in the Thanjavur taluk of Thanjavur district, Tamil Nadu, India.

Demographics 

As per the 2001 census, Sakkarasamandram had a total population of 2076 with 1052 males and 1024 females. The sex ratio was 973. The literacy rate was 70.77.

References 

 

Villages in Thanjavur district